The 2012–13 Washington State Cougars men's basketball team represented Washington State University during the 2012–13 NCAA Division I men's basketball season. The Cougars played their home games on Jack Friel Court at Beasley Coliseum in Pullman, Washington and were members of the Pac-12 Conference. They were led by fourth year head coach Ken Bone. They finished the season with a record of 13–19 overall, 4–14 in Pac-12 play to finish in a last place tie with Oregon State. They lost in the first round of the Pac-12 tournament to in-state rival Washington.

Roster

Schedule

|-
|-
!colspan=9| Exhibition

|-
!colspan=9| Regular Season

|-
!colspan=9| Pac-12 Conference tournament

References

Washington State Cougars men's basketball seasons
Washington State
Washington State
Washington State